Ruth Rasnic (Hebrew: רות רזניק, b. 1932) is an Israeli social and political activist in the struggle against domestic violence in Israel, a writer and a translator. Rasnic won the Israel Prize in 2009 for her life's work.

Early years
Rasnic (née Lask) was born in Jerusalem and spent her childhood there and in Tel Aviv. At the age of 14 she joined the Etzel, and two years later joined a youth settlement group at kibbutz Ruhama. She served in the Israeli Air Force, and later worked at the Israeli embassy in London. She returned to Israel in 1956, after the death of her younger brother in the line of duty.

Activism
In 1977, she established L.O. Combat Violence Against Women, a non-profit organization dedicated to fighting violence against women, of which she was the paid executive director for 34 years, from 1977 to 2011, a year in which she became a volunteer.

Rasnic was one of the founders of the liberal Ratz political party, and served as the party's representative in Na'amat from 1981 to 1996.

In 1986, Rasnic joined the founders of the Israel Women's Network, headed by Prof. Alice Shalvi, as a member and organizer.

Prizes and awards
In 1991 and in 2006, Rasnic was recognized by the Israel Woman's Network for her contributions.

In 2000, she was chosen to light a torch in the annual ceremony at the Mount Herzl military cemetery, closing Israel's Memorial Day for fallen soldiers, an honor bestowed on valued members of society.

In 2008, she was appointed by Prime Minister Ehud Olmert to his advisory council for women's stature.

In 2009, Rasnic was awarded the Israel Prize for her lifetime achievement & special contribution to society and the State.

See also 
List of Israel Prize recipients
Women's Spirit

References

External links

Feminism in Contemporary Israel
Women in Israel

1932 births
Living people
Israeli Jews
Israeli activists
Israeli women activists
21st-century Israeli women politicians
Israel Prize for lifetime achievement & special contribution to society recipients
Israel Prize women recipients
People from Tel Aviv
Israeli women's rights activists
Israeli feminists
Ratz (political party) politicians
Israeli people of Polish-Jewish descent
Jewish feminists
Jewish women activists
People from Jerusalem
Irgun members
Israeli Air Force personnel
Israeli female military personnel
Israeli diplomats
Israeli women diplomats
Kibbutzniks
Israeli translators
Jewish translators